Barracudas may refer to:
 Barracuda,  a large, predatory ray-finned fish

Music
 The Barracudas, an English surf rock band

Sport
 Birmingham Barracudas, a Canadian football team in Alabama
 Boston Barracudas, an English speedway team
 Brisbane Barracudas, an Australian water polo club
 Brunei Barracudas, a basketball team
 Burlington Barracudas, a women's ice hockey team in Ontario, Canada
 CenTex Barracudas, an indoor football team in Belton, Texas
 Emerald Coast Barracudas, a women's American football team in Panama City Beach, Florida
 Jacksonville Barracudas, an ice hockey team in Florida
 Long Beach Barracudas, a baseball team in California
 Pensacola Barracudas (arena football), an American football team in Florida
 Pensacola Barracudas (soccer), a soccer team in Florida
 San Diego Barracudas, an inline hockey team in California